Adam Green may refer to:

Adam Green (filmmaker) (born 1975), writer/director of Hatchet
Adam Green (footballer) (born 1984), English footballer
Adam Green (journalist), New York–based journalist
Adam Green (musician) (born 1981), former member of The Moldy Peaches and now a solo artist

See also
Adam's Green, hamlet in Dorset, England